Thorburn is a surname, and may refer to:
 Alexander Thorburn (1836–1894), Scottish-born Canadian politician; provincial legislator in the Northwest Territories 1888–1891
 Archibald Thorburn (1860–1935), Scottish bird illustrator
 Chris Thorburn (born 1983), Canadian ice hockey player
 Cliff Thorburn (born 1948), Canadian snooker player
 James Thorburn (physician) (1830–1905), Canadian physician and University of Toronto professor
 Sir James Thorburn (governor) (1864–1929), British governor of the Gold Coast (now Ghana)
 John A. Thorburn (1946–2010), American Special Forces soldier and minor actor
 June Thorburn (1931–1967), English actress; killed in an air crash
 Nicholas Thorburn (born 1981), Canadian musician and songwriter
 Paul Thorburn (born 1962), Welsh rugby union football player
 Peter Thorburn (contemporary), New Zealand rugby union coach
 R.A. Thorburn or R.A. the Rugged Man, American rapper 
 Ray Thorburn (1930–1986), Australian politician from Cook; member of Parliament 1972–1975
 Robert Thorburn (1836–1906), Scottish-born Canadian politician from Newfoundland; premier of Newfoundland 1885–1889
 Shona Thorburn (born 1982), English professional basketball player in the United States
 Steven J. Thorburn (born 1962), American engineer in acoustics, technology system design and lighting
 Thomas Thorburn (1913–2003), Swedish economist

Places
 Thorburn, Nova Scotia

See also
Thoburn
Thulborn
Thurber (disambiguation)
Torbjörn
Turbin